"Break It Up" is a song by the American alternative rock band Rocket from the Crypt, released as the third and final single from their 1998 album RFTC. It was released by Elemental Records in three versions: as a 7" vinyl single and as two different CD singles, each with a different track list. Although a music video was filmed, the single did not chart. In fact, of the three singles released from the album, only "Lipstick" managed to make the UK Singles Chart.

Track listing
All songs written by Rocket from the Crypt

7" version

Personnel
Speedo (John Reis) - guitar, lead vocals
ND (Andy Stamets) - guitar, backing vocals
Petey X (Pete Reichert) - bass guitar, backing vocals
Apollo 9 (Paul O'Beirne) - saxophone, vibraslap, backing vocals
JC 2000 (Jason Crane) - trumpet, percussion, organ, backing vocals
Atom (Adam Willard) - drums, timbales
Kevin Shirley - recording, production, and mixing of "Break it Up"
Adi Winman - engineering of "Turkish Revenge", "Crack Attack", "U.S. Army", and "Raped By Ape"

References 

1998 singles
Rocket from the Crypt songs
Song recordings produced by Kevin Shirley
1998 songs